Stillwater is a 2021 American crime drama film directed by Tom McCarthy, based on a script he co-wrote with Marcus Hinchey, Thomas Bidegain and Noé Debré. It is the first DreamWorks Pictures film to be distributed by Focus Features. It stars Matt Damon as an unemployed oil-rig worker from Oklahoma who sets out with a French woman (Camille Cottin) to prove his convicted daughter's (Abigail Breslin) innocence.

The film had its world premiere at the Cannes Film Festival on July 8, 2021, and was released theatrically in the United States on July 30, 2021, by Focus Features. It received generally positive reviews from critics and grossed $19 million against its $20 million budget.

Plot
Stillwater, Oklahoma roughneck Bill Baker (Damon) travels to Marseille, Southern France to visit his daughter Allison, who is five years into serving a nine-year prison sentence. While attending university in Marseille, Allison was convicted of killing her roommate and unfaithful lover, Lina.

During Bill's first meeting with Allison, she asks him to pass a letter to her defense lawyer, Mrs. Leparq. Bill finds Leparq, who tells him that the letter says that Allison heard from her former professor about a man who claimed to be Lina's killer. Leparq refuses to attempt to reopen the case because the new information is just hearsay. Bill lies to Allison, telling her that Leparq will petition the judge to reopen the case.

Bill meets a woman named Virginie and her daughter Maya at his hotel. He asks Virginie to translate the letter, where he learns not only about his daughter's desperation at the sentence, but also about how little faith she has in her father's ability to help with the situation. Bill visits the professor mentioned in the letter, who gives him the phone number of someone who claims to know Lina's killer. Bill and Virginie meet with the girl, who names the killer as Akim.

Combing through social media, Virginie and her girlfriend, Nedjma, print photos of people in the social circles of Allison and Lina. Bill brings the photos to Allison, who identifies Akim. Bill then uses the photo to track down Akim at a housing project, but Bill is beaten by Akim's friends after drawing too much attention, while Akim escapes. The next time that he meets Allison, Bill confesses that he lied about Leparq agreeing to help and that he found Akim but didn't tell the police. Enraged that Bill squandered her one chance for exoneration, Allison tells him to never return to the prison.

Four months later, Bill has remained in Marseille, renting a room in Virginie's apartment and working on a construction crew. During Allison's one free day out of prison that year, Bill thinks that he reconnects with her, but that evening as she goes back to prison she attempts suicide by trying to hang herself. Bill is devastated but he continues to visit her and as their regular visits continue he reconnects with her.
Bill and Virginie also establish a closer relationship and Bill finally thinks his life is back on track.
One night at an Olympique de Marseille game, which Bill attends with Maya, he spots Akim and follows him to his truck after the match has finished.
Bill approaches Akim and knocks him out and locks him in the basement of their apartment building where Virginie, Maya and Bill live. Bill implores Maya to keep the secret, and she agrees.

Bill pays a private investigator to have a lock of Akim's hair tested against the crime scene's DNA evidence. Akim tells Bill that Allison had hired him to kill Lina and that she paid him with a gold necklace bearing the word "Stillwater". Bill begins to doubt Allison's innocence. The private investigator suspects that Bill is keeping Akim in the basement, so he poses as a building inspector and asks Virginie if she has noticed any smells or noises from the basement, which she denies, but her suspicions are aroused. Police officers find and detain Bill, but after a fruitless search of the basement, the police question Maya, who lies about not having seen the hostage. After the police leave, Virginie demands that Bill move out for having put Maya at risk during Akim's abduction. Oddly, Virginie never tells Bill if she was involved with Akim leaving the basement or where Akim is now.  Afterward,  Bill hugs a crying Maya goodbye, and moves back into the hotel.

Leparq meets with Bill to tell him that new proof will allow the case to be reopened, with a DNA test exonerating Allison, but is confused by Bill's numb reaction.

After Allison and Bill return to Oklahoma to a hero's welcome, Bill asks Allison about the Stillwater necklace that he gave her when she had departed for Marseille. Allison breaks down and admits she hired Akim to evict Lina from their house after they had broken up, but claims that she did not intend for Lina to be killed, as Akim misunderstood her intentions to "put her out" of the apartment. The next morning as they sit on the porch, Allison says everything looks the same in Stillwater while Bill admits everything looks different to him, almost to the point of him not recognizing it anymore.

Cast
 Matt Damon as Bill Baker, an unemployed roughneck whose daughter ends up wrongly imprisoned for murder in France.  Bill believes in his daughter's innocence so strongly that he takes up investigating her case when no one else will.
 Abigail Breslin as Allison Baker, Bill's daughter.  Convicted of murdering her roommate and lover Lina, she still maintains her innocence even after five years of imprisonment.  She inadvertently sets her father out to investigate her case by asking him to pass a letter to her lawyer.  
 Camille Cottin as Virginie, a single mother living in France who decides to help Bill investigate his daughter's case.  She rents Bill a room and translates for him as he pursues leads.
 Lilou Siauvaud as Maya, Virginie's daughter.  Bill helps Virginie care for Maya and acts as a father figure to her.  
 Deanna Dunagan as Sharon, Bill's mother-in-law and Allison's grandmother.  She helps support Bill and Allison financially and coordinates with Allison on Bill's visits to France.
 Idir Azougli as Akim, the mystery man that Bill believes is the real killer.
 Anne Le Ny as Leparq, Allison's lawyer.
 Moussa Maaskri as Dirosa, a retired police officer who offers to help Bill for money.  
 William Nadylam as Patrick, a university professor whom Bill tracks down for information on the real killer's identity.

Production

It was announced in July 2019 that Tom McCarthy would write and direct the film, with Matt Damon set to star. Abigail Breslin was added to the cast later in the month, with filming beginning in August 2019. Camille Cottin was added to the cast in September. Mychael Danna composed the film's score. It was filmed on location in Oklahoma and Marseille.

Allison is in Marseilles, which is the hometown of Edmond Dantès in The Count of Monte Cristo. Dantès was convicted of a crime he did not commit and sent to the Marseille prison island Château d'If, which is visible in the background of several scenes in which Allison and Bill are swimming.

Release
The film had its world premiere at the Cannes Film Festival on July 8, 2021. It was scheduled to be released in the U.S. on November 6, 2020, but was delayed due to the COVID-19 pandemic until July 30, 2021.

Reception

Box office
Stillwater grossed $14.6 million in the United States and Canada, and $5.4 million in other territories, for a worldwide total of $19.8 million.

In the United States and Canada, Stillwater was released alongside Jungle Cruise and The Green Knight, and was projected to gross around $5 million from 2,531 theaters in its opening weekend. The film made $1.8 million on its first day, including $280,000 from Thursday-night previews. It went on to debut with $5.2 million, finishing fifth. The film fell 45% to $2.6 million in its second weekend, remaining in fifth place.

Critical response
On the review aggregator website Rotten Tomatoes, the film holds an approval rating of 75% based on 194 reviews, with an average rating of 6.6/10. The site's critics consensus reads, "Stillwater isn't perfect, but its thoughtful approach to intelligent themes – and strong performances from its leads – give this timely drama a steadily building power." On Metacritic, the film has a weighted average score of 60 out of 100, based on 41 critics, indicating "mixed or average reviews". Audiences polled by CinemaScore gave the film an average grade of "B−" on an A+ to F scale, while 63% of PostTrak audience members gave it a positive score, with 34% saying that they would definitely recommend it.

Richard Roeper of the Chicago Sun-Times gave the film a score of 3.5/4 stars, describing it as "provocative and stirring" and praising Damon's performance as Bill Baker, but wrote: "Bill is also prone to rash actions, which leads to a relatively late development in "Stillwater" that is jarring and misguided and lands this movie just short of greatness." David Sims of The Atlantic noted similarities between the film and director Tom McCarthy's previous films, The Visitor and Win Win, but added: "McCarthy's excellent, if sprawling, script is more interested in the humans behind the headlines and the messy ways people try to reconcile their grief and guilt after indescribable trauma." Simran Hans of The Observer gave the film a score of 3/5 stars, describing it as "a thoughtful, knotty character study, albeit one nestled inside a polished, and less interesting, action thriller."

Brian Lowry of CNN was more critical of the film, writing that it "confounds expectations in mostly frustrating ways", and that it "runs long but doesn't run particularly deep – or at least, not quite deep enough." Clarisse Loughrey of The Independent gave the film a score of 2/5 stars, describing it as "an empty gesture of a film", and wrote: "It doesn't reckon with the injustice Knox faced. Nor does it sympathise with her time behind bars. She doesn't even get to be the main character. That would be Matt Damon's Bill Baker, Allison's father – a completely fictional figure, with none of this family's details matching up to Knox's."

Amanda Knox reaction
Amanda Knox, whose real life story is thought to have inspired the movie, denounced the film and its creators on Twitter for profiting from her wrongful conviction and for distorting the facts of her story. Knox said, "by fictionalizing away my innocence, my total lack of involvement, by erasing the role of the authorities in my wrongful conviction, McCarthy reinforces an image of me as a guilty and untrustworthy person."

References

External links
 
 Official screenplay

2021 LGBT-related films
2021 crime drama films
American crime drama films
American LGBT-related films
Anonymous Content films
DreamWorks Pictures films
Participant (company) films
Focus Features films
Universal Pictures films
Films about father–daughter relationships
Films directed by Tom McCarthy
Films postponed due to the COVID-19 pandemic
Films scored by Mychael Danna
Films set in prison
Films set in Marseille
Films set in Oklahoma
Films shot in Marseille
Films shot in Oklahoma
Films with screenplays by Thomas Bidegain
Lesbian-related films
LGBT-related drama films
Films à clef
2020s American films